Mechanitis mazaeus, the Mazaeus tigerwing, is a species of butterfly of the family Nymphalidae. It is found in South America.

The larvae have been recorded feeding on Solanum species, including S. subnerme.

Subspecies
M. m. mazaeus (Brazil)
M. m. beebei Forbes, 1948 (Venezuela)
M. m. egaensis Bates, 1862 (Brazil)
M. m. deceptus Butler, 1873 (Ecuador and Peru)
M. m. fallax Butler, 1873 (Colombia, Brazil and Peru)
M. m. holmgreni Bryk, 1953 (Bolivia and Peru)
M. m. lanei Fox, 1967 (Brazil)
M. m. messenoides C. & R. Felder, 1865 (Colombia)
M. m. pannifera Butler, 1877 (Suriname, the Guyanas and Brazil)
M. m. pothetoide d'Almeida, 1951 (Brazil)
M. m. visenda Butler, 1877 (Brazil)

References

Butterflies described in 1860
Ithomiini
Fauna of Brazil
Nymphalidae of South America
Taxa named by William Chapman Hewitson